John "Jack" William Dyson (6 September 1866 – ) was an English rugby union footballer who played in the 1890s. He played at representative level for England, and at club level for Huddersfield, as a three-quarters, i.e. wing or centre. Prior to Tuesday 27 August 1895, Huddersfield was a rugby union club.

Background
Jack Dyson was born in Skelmanthorpe, West Riding of Yorkshire, and he died aged 42 in Huddersfield, West Riding of Yorkshire.

Playing career

International honours 
Jack Dyson won caps for England while at Huddersfield in 1890 against Scotland, in 1892 against Scotland, and in 1893 against Ireland, and Scotland.

In the early years of rugby football the goal was to score goals, and a try had zero value, but it provided the opportunity to try at goal, and convert the try to a goal with an unopposed kick at the goal posts. The point values of both the try and goal have varied over time, and in the early years, footballers could "score" a try, without scoring any points.

Change of Code 
When Huddersfield converted from the rugby union code to the rugby league code on Tuesday 27 August 1895, Jack Dyson would have been 28. Consequently, he may have been both a rugby union and rugby league footballer for Huddersfield.

References

External links 
 Search for "Dyson" at rugbyleagueproject.org
Search for "John Dyson" at britishnewspaperarchive.co.uk
Search for "Jack Dyson" at britishnewspaperarchive.co.uk

1866 births
1909 deaths
England international rugby union players
English rugby union players
Huddersfield Giants players
People from Skelmanthorpe
Rugby union three-quarters
Rugby union players from Yorkshire